The 2014 World RX of Sweden was the fifth round of the inaugural season of the FIA World Rallycross Championship. The event was held at the Höljesbanan in Höljes, Värmland.

Heats

Semi-finals

Semi-final 1

Semi-final 2

Final

Championship standings after the event

References

External links

|- style="text-align:center"
|width="35%"|Previous race:2014 World RX of Finland
|width="30%"|FIA World Rallycross Championship2014 season
|width="35%"|Next race:2014 World RX of Belgium
|- style="text-align:center"
|width="35%"|Previous race:None
|width="30%"|World RX of Sweden
|width="35%"|Next race:2015 World RX of Sweden
|- style="text-align:center"

Sweden
World RX